A Michigan salad is a type of green salad popular at restaurants in the Detroit area and other parts of Michigan.  It is typically topped with dried cherries, blue cheese, and a vinaigrette dressing. Some recipes use dried cranberries instead of cherries, add other kinds of fruit such as apple or mandarin orange, omit or substitute the blue cheese, and/or add walnuts or pecans.

In Western Michigan, a Michigan salad might include grapes, sliced apples, and walnuts or pecans. It often will have a mayonnaise and mustard based dressing, rather than a vinaigrette.

See also
Waldorf salad
 List of salads

References

Salads
Cuisine of the Midwestern United States
Culture of Detroit